Bidyanus is a genus of ray-finned fishes, from the family Terapontidae, the grunters and tigerperches. They are freshwater species which are endemic to Australia.

Species
There are two species in the genus Bidyanus:

 Bidyanus bidyanus (Mitchell, 1838) (silver perch)
 Bidyanus welchi (McCulloch & Waite, 1917) (Welch's grunter)

References

 
Terapontidae